High Elms Country Park is an extensive  public park on the North Downs in Farnborough in the London Borough of Bromley. It is a Local Nature Reserve, and together with the neighbouring Downe Bank, a Site of Special Scientific Interest. The park surrounds High Elms Golf Course, and has extensive woodland, chiefly oak and beech, chalk meadows and formal gardens. It also has a cafe, a visitor centre, nature and history trails and car parks.

The idverde Countryside Team, who manage Bromley owned parks, are based at High Elms.

There is access from High Elms Road and Shire Lane.

History

The history of the High Elms estate can be traced back to the Norman Conquest, when it was given by William the Conqueror to his half-brother, Odo, bishop of Bayeux. For successive generations afterwards the land occupied now by the golf course was given over to farming. In 1809 a wealthy London Banker and Member of Parliament, John William Lubbock, bought the 260 acres, which we now know as the High Elms Estate as a country residence and in 1840 the astronomer and banker, Sir John Lubbock, 3rd Baronet inherited it. He built a grand new mansion in the Italian style. After Charles Darwin moved in 1842 into the nearby Down House on the other side of the village of Downe, Lubbock's son, also called John Lubbock, the fourth baronet, and later Baron Avebury, befriended him, being a frequent visitor to Down House.

In 1938 the estate was sold to Kent County Council and the house became a nurses' training centre. In 1965 the area became part of the London Borough of Bromley, and the estate was transferred to the new borough. The land then became public open space, but in 1967 the mansion burnt down.

Listed buildings

There are the following Grade II Listed Buildings in and around the park:
Eighteenth-century Gate Piers and Wrought Iron Railings
Cuckoo Lodge
Eton Fives Court, built about 1840
Grotto, constructed between 1885 and 1896
Ice Well, constructed about 1850
Old Lodge, early nineteenth-century cottage
Outhouse at the Clock House, probably a granary with a horse gin, early nineteenth century
Stone Garden Shelter, circa 1913
The Clock House, early nineteenth-century stables of High Elms converted to a house

BEECHE

Bromley Council has established the Bromley Environmental Education Centre at High Elms (BEECHE) at the park, with environmental  programmes for schools and public events in the school holidays.

See also
 Bromley parks and open spaces
 List of Sites of Special Scientific Interest in London
 List of Local Nature Reserves in Greater London
 The Friends of High Elms

References

External links 

 London Borough of Bromley, High Elms Country Park Local Nature Reserve
 https://www.bromleyparks.co.uk/beeche/
 Natural England, Nature on the Map, Downe Bank & High Elms (SSSI)
 Gardens of Kent, High Elms Country Park
 London Borough of Bromley, High Elms Trail
 Hidden London, High Elms
 High Elms Golf Club, Historic High Elms
	

Parks and open spaces in the London Borough of Bromley
Sites of Special Scientific Interest in London
Country parks in London
Local nature reserves in Greater London
Grade II listed buildings in the London Borough of Bromley